Clamor may refer to:
Clamor (magazine), a bi-monthly magazine published in Toledo, Ohio
Clamor (ministry), a Christian youth outreach ministry in the U.S. and the Caribbean